Fifty-Fifty  is a 1925 American silent drama film starring Hope Hampton, Lionel Barrymore, and Louise Glaum. Directed and produced by Henri Diamant-Berger for the production company Encore Pictures, Fifty-Fifty is a remake of a 1916 Norma Talmadge film also titled Fifty-fifty that was directed by Allan Dwan, who wrote the original story.

The film was exhibited the week of January 3, 1926, in Los Angeles, at the Hillstreet Theatre, which featured both vaudeville and movies.

Plot
American millionaire Frederick Harmon (played by Lionel Barrymore) is in Paris, France, for business and pleasure. While enjoying the Parisian night life, he meets and falls in love with Ginette (played by Hope Hampton), a fashion model who moonlights as an apache dancer in a nightclub.

They marry and he returns to New York with her. When Harmon meets the urbane divorcee Nina Olmstead (played by Louise Glaum) he becomes involved in an affair. Ginette discovers her husband's infidelity and decides to win him back by going out with an old boyfriend, Jean (played by Jean Del Val), a member of the Paris underworld.

Nina schemes to end the marriage of the Harmons using the seeming romance between Ginette and Jean. Harmon learns of Nina's treachery and her attempt to estrange the couple fails. He realizes that Ginette was merely trying to make him jealous and that he completely trusts her loyalty to him. They are happily reconciled.

Cast

Preservation
With no prints of Fifty-Fifty located in any film archives, it is a lost film.

See also
Lionel Barrymore filmography

References

External links

Fifty-Fifty at the AFI Catalog of Feature Films

Fifty-Fifty Theatrical Poster
Lobby poster

1925 films
Silent American drama films
American silent feature films
American black-and-white films
1925 drama films
Lost American films
1925 lost films
Lost drama films
Associated Exhibitors films
Films set in Paris
Films directed by Henri Diamant-Berger
1920s American films